The Vutcani is a right tributary of the river Elan in Romania. It flows into the Elan in Poșta Elan.

References

Rivers of Romania
Rivers of Vaslui County
Tributaries of the Prut